= Bhatkudgaon =

Village in Maharashtra

Bhatkudgaon is a village of Shevgaon Taluka in the Ahmednagar district in the state of Maharashtra, India. It is about 52 kilometres (32 mi) northeast of Ahmednagar and 52 kilometres (32 mi) from Aurangabad.

Bhatkudgaon has a population of more than 11,000.
